Sinomicrurus kelloggi, also known as Kellog's coral snake or Kellogg's coral snake, is a species of venomous snake in the family Elapidae. It is found in Vietnam, northern Laos, and southern China. The holotype measures 774 mm, of which 70 mm consist of the tail. This species has a black head and has a white V-shaped spot. Its back is purple-brown and stained with 22 black transverse markings with light rims. Its ventral side is milky white stained with 49 black marks of variable size.

References 

kelloggi
Snakes of China
Snakes of Vietnam
Snakes of Asia
Reptiles of Laos
Reptiles of Vietnam
Taxa named by Clifford H. Pope
Reptiles described in 1928